Tiri is a village in Võru Parish, Võru County in southeastern Estonia. It has a population of 12 and an area of 4.8 km².

References

Villages in Võru County